Dezső von Zirthy (born 5 December 1902, date of death unknown) was a Hungarian sports shooter. He competed in the 25 m pistol event at the 1936 Summer Olympics.

References

1902 births
Year of death missing
Hungarian male sport shooters
Olympic shooters of Hungary
Shooters at the 1936 Summer Olympics
Sport shooters from Budapest